In enzymology, a long-chain-fatty-acid—luciferin-component ligase is an enzyme that catalyzes the chemical reaction

ATP + an acid + protein  AMP + diphosphate + an acyl-protein thioester

The 3 substrates of this enzyme are ATP, acid, and protein, whereas its 3 products are AMP, diphosphate, and acyl-protein thioester.

This enzyme belongs to the family of ligases, specifically those forming carbon-sulfur bonds as acid-thiol ligases.  The systematic name of this enzyme class is long-chain-fatty-acid:protein ligase (AMP-forming). This enzyme is also called acyl-protein synthetase.

References

 
 

EC 6.2.1
Enzymes of unknown structure